For a few marbles more (original title: Voor een paar knikkers meer) is a 2006 short Dutch film directed by Jelmar Hufen. The film was selected for over 240 film festivals in 57 countries and received 41 awards. 'For a few marbles more' is the most selected and awarded Dutch (short) film ever.

Plot
Four ten–year-olds are kicked out of their favorite playground by two aggressive drunkards. When they realize their parents are not going to help them, there's only one solution. They have to find a way to get the toughest boy in the neighborhood to help them. From that moment on the four friends are in for an exciting adventure.

Awards
 Winner ‘Best Director’ - The YoungCuts Film Festival, Canada
 Winner ‘DokuKids Award’ - Dokufest International Documentary and Short Film Festival, Kosovo
 2nd place ‘Best Short Drama’ – The End of the Pier International Film Festival, UK
 2nd place ‘Best Short European Film’ – The End of the Pier International Film Festival, UK
 Special Mention - SCHLINGEL International Film Festival, Germany

References

External links
 Official Web Site
 
 
 Stills from Voor een paar knikkers meer

2000s Dutch-language films
Dutch short films
2006 short films